Mohammad Naved Ashraf Qureshi (born 4 September 1974) is a Pakistani cricketer. He is a right-handed batsman and a right-arm medium-pace bowler.

Ashraf has played in two Test matches. He also had a minor foray into Twenty20 cricket.

References

1974 births
Living people
Pakistan Test cricketers
Pakistani cricketers
Rawalpindi cricketers
Rawalpindi B cricketers
Khan Research Laboratories cricketers
Redco Pakistan Limited cricketers
Zarai Taraqiati Bank Limited cricketers
Federal Areas cricketers
Rawalpindi Rams cricketers
Cricketers from Rawalpindi